This page features the full videography of singer Anna Vissi.

DVDs

Music videos

External links
Anna Vissi's official website
IFPI Greece official website with Greek charts

Videography
Music videographies
Videographies of Greek artists